George W. Greer (born 1942) is a retired Florida circuit judge who served in Florida's Sixth Circuit Court (Pinellas-Pasco counties), family law division, in Clearwater, Florida. He received national attention in 2005 when he presided over the Terri Schiavo case.

Early life and education
Born in 1942 in Brooklyn, New York, Greer grew up in Dunedin, Florida. He received his Associate degree from St. Petersburg Junior College in 1962, his bachelor's degree from Florida State University at Tallahassee in 1964, and his law degree from the University of Florida's College of Law in Gainesville in 1966.

Career
Greer is a Republican who was once a member of a Southern Baptist Church.

Greer served as a county commissioner for Pinellas County as a Republican from 1984 to 1992. He was first elected to the probate judgeship in 1992 on a nonpartisan ballot, and was reelected in 1998 and again in 2004. He retired in 2010 when his term expired.

Terri Schiavo case

Greer received substantial attention in national and international media for his involvement in the Terri Schiavo case.

Because Greer's controversial decisions in the Schiavo case conflicted with the opinions of patrons at his church, the Calvary Baptist Church of Clearwater, Greer was asked by pastor William Rice to clarify his relationship with his church. Greer then withdrew his membership from the Calvary congregation.

In 2005 Greer was threatened with impeachment for his decisions in the Terri Schiavo case. Attorney Barry Cohen represented Greer, who retained his position.

Hogan divorce case
Greer presided over the 2008 divorce case of Hulk Hogan and his wife, Linda Bollea. On January 30, 2008, Greer denied Bollea's motion to have Hogan's assets frozen.

References

External links
St. Petersburg Times article
University of Pennsylvania Center for Bioethics 10th Anniversary Symposium

American politicians with disabilities
American blind people
Blind politicians
Florida state court judges
1942 births
Living people
Terri Schiavo case
People from Dunedin, Florida
Florida Republicans
Florida lawyers
Florida State University alumni
Fredric G. Levin College of Law alumni